Ambatondrazaka Suburbaine is a town and rural commune in Madagascar. It located close to the town Ambatondrazaka and belongs to the district of Ambatondrazaka, which is a part of Alaotra-Mangoro Region. The population of the commune was estimated to be approximately 20,000 in 2001 commune census.

Only primary schooling is available. It is also a site of industrial-scale  mining. The majority 82% of the population of the commune are farmers, while an additional 6% receives their livelihood from raising livestock. The most important crop is rice, while other important products are beans, maize and cassava.  Industry and services provide employment for 0.5% and 3% of the population, respectively. Additionally fishing employs 8.5% of the population.

References and notes 

Populated places in Alaotra-Mangoro